Snake berry (or snakeberry) is a common name for several plants and may refer to:
 Actaea rubra
 Clintonia borealis
 Maianthemum dilatatum
 Potentilla indica, with fruits similar in appearance to a strawberry
 Solanum dulcamara
 A general term for many plants producing berries of unknown edibility